Empalme (Spanish: "junction", "splice", "union") may refer to
Places
Empalme, Sonora, city in northern Mexico
Empalme Villa Constitución, town in the Argentine province of Santa Fe
El Empalme, town in the Ecuadorian province of Guayas
Empalme Escobedo, in the Mexican state of Guanajuato
Empalme Nicolich, in Uruguay
Empalme Olmos, in Uruguay
Other
Empalme (food), tortilla sandwich originating in the Mexican state of Nuevo León
 Empalme (Madrid Metro), station on Line 5 of the Madrid Metro